Mimocorus quadricristatus is a species of beetle in the family Cerambycidae, and the only species in the genus Mimocorus. It was described by Breuning in 1942.

References

Crossotini
Beetles described in 1942
Monotypic beetle genera